A pioneer organism, also called a disaster taxon, is an organism that populates a region after a (short-term) natural disaster, mass extinction, or any other event that kills off most life in that area.

Natural disaster
After a natural disaster, common pioneer organisms include lichens and algae. Mosses usually follow lichens in colonization but cannot serve as pioneer organisms. These common pioneer organisms can have a preference in the temperatures they are in. Lichens are more inclined to be in regions with more rainfall, whereas algae and mosses have a preference of being in regions with more humidity.

Pioneer organisms modify their environment and establish conditions that accommodate other organisms. In some circumstances, other organisms can be considered pioneer organisms. Birds are usually the first to inhabit newly-created islands, and seeds, such as the coconut, may also be the first arrivals on barren soil.

Extinction event
Since the resolution of the fossil record is low, pioneer organisms are often identified as those that lived within hundreds, thousands, or a million years of the extinction event. For example, after the Permian–Triassic extinction event 252 million years ago, Lystrosaurus, a tusked therapsid, was considered a disaster taxon.

See also 
 Ecological succession
 Primary succession
 Secondary succession

References

Ecological succession
Population ecology